Dacatria is a genus of ants in the subfamily Myrmicinae. It contains the single species Dacatria templaris, first described from South Korea. The genus is known only from South Korea, Vietnam and China.

References

External links

Myrmicinae
Monotypic ant genera
Hymenoptera of Asia